North Bay is a city in Northeastern Ontario, Canada. It is the seat of Nipissing District, and takes its name from its position on the shore of Lake Nipissing. North Bay developed as a railroad centre, and its airport was an important military location during the Cold War.

History

The site of North Bay is part of a historic canoe route where Samuel de Champlain took a party up the Ottawa River, through present-day Mattawa, on to Trout Lake and via the La Vase Creek to Lake Nipissing.

Apart from Indigenous people, voyageurs and surveyors, there was little activity in the Lake Nipissing area until the arrival of the Canadian Pacific Railway (CPR) in 1882.

That was the point where the Canada Central Railway (CCR) extension ended. The CCR was owned by Duncan McIntyre who amalgamated it with the CPR and became one of the handful of officers of the newly formed CPR. The CCR started in Brockville and extended to Pembroke. It then followed a westward route along the Ottawa River passing through places like Cobden, Deux-Rivières, and eventually to Mattawa at the confluence of the Mattawa and Ottawa Rivers. It then proceeded cross-country towards its final destination, Bonfield. Duncan McIntyre and his contractor James Worthington piloted the CCR expansion. Worthington continued on as the construction superintendent for the CPR past Bonfield. He remained with the CPR for about a year until he left the company. McIntyre was uncle to John Ferguson, who staked out future North Bay after getting assurance from his uncle and Worthington that it would be the divisional headquarters and a location of some importance.

In 1882, John Ferguson decided that the north bay of Lake Nipissing was a promising spot for settlement. North Bay was incorporated as a town in 1891. The first mayor was John Bourke. More importantly, Bourke developed the western portion of North Bay after purchasing the interest of the Murray Brothers from Pembroke, who were large landholders in the new community. The land west of Klock Avenue (Algonquin Avenue) was known as the Murray block. Bourke Street is named after John Bourke. Murray Street is named after the Murrays.

North Bay was selected as the southern terminus of the Temiskaming and Northern Ontario Railway (T&NO) in 1902, when the Ross government took the bold move to establish a development road to serve the Haileybury settlement. During construction of the T&NO, silver was discovered at Cobalt and started a mining frenzy in the northern part of the province that continued for many years. The Canadian Northern Railway was subsequently built to North Bay in 1913.

In July 1894, an Act to Charter the Montreal, Ottawa and Georgian Bay Canal passed without a ripple of concern in North Bay. The Georgian Bay Canal was a mammoth transportation system that proposed to connect the Great Lakes with the Atlantic Ocean. The entire passageway from the Ottawa River to Lake Nipissing and down the French River to Georgian Bay was surveyed in the first decade of the 20th century. Financing was a large obstacle and, as time passed, transportation patterns changed and interfered with the earlier practicality of the giant venture. Despite this, there were groups who still hoped it would happen as late as 1930.

North Bay grew through a strong lumbering sector, mining and the three railways in the early days. The town benefited from strong community leadership and people like Richardson, Milne, McNamara, Englands, Browning, McDougal, Carruthers, McGaughey, George W. Lee, Senator Gordon, T. J. Patton, Charlie Harrison and many others are responsible for its development. In 1919, John Ferguson was elected mayor of North Bay and continued to serve as mayor until 1922. North Bay was incorporated as a city in August 1925.

The Dionne Quintuplets were born in Corbeil, Ontario, on the southern outskirts of North Bay in 1934. Their births had a tremendous impact on tourism in the area. For a province struggling against economic strangulation they were as valuable a resource as gold, nickel, pulpwood or hydro power. They saved an entire region from bankruptcy. They launched Northern Ontario's flourishing tourist industry. At their peak they represented a $500 million asset. North Bay and the surrounding area lived off this legacy well into the 1960s. Many visitors to the area discovered lakes and summer retreats that were easily accessible, and the businesses thrived on the tourist dollars.

In January 1968, the City of North Bay amalgamated with West Ferris and Widdifield townships.

In 1951, as a result of rising tensions in the Cold War, the Royal Canadian Air Force established an air base at North Bay, part of an expanding national air defence network to counter the threat of nuclear attack against North America by Soviet bombers. Construction of RCAF Station North Bay (in 1966 retitled "Canadian Forces Base North Bay" and in 1993 as "22 Wing/Canadian Forces Base North Bay") took three years, during which it became the largest industry in the community: a status it held for more than four decades. In October 1963, the North American Air Defence Command (NORAD) opened its Canadian operations centre at the base. Manned by American as well as Canadian military personnel, the centre, situated 60 storeys underground to withstand a nuclear strike, monitored Canada's northern, east-central and Atlantic airspace, identifying and tracking all air traffic in this airspace, and responding to airborne emergencies, crime, and suspicious, unknown and potentially hostile aircraft. In 1983 this responsibility was expanded to all of Canada, and in October 2006 the base's NORAD operations (as of 1981, called North American Aerospace Defence Command) moved into a new, state-of-the-art facility above ground, where it continues to provide surveillance, identification and tracking of aircraft, and warning and response to emergencies, attacks and other crises, for the air sovereignty of Canada and North America. In summer of 2013, the base commenced surveillance of space via SAPPHIRE, Canada's first military satellite, that was launched into orbit from India in February.

Beginning in the 1990s, the base weathered a series of massive cuts by the federal government, and at one point was earmarked to close. Subsequently, a large portion of its infrastructure, including all of its airfield assets, such as hangars, fuel depot and control tower, were sold or demolished. By the 21st century, the base was no longer the city's top industry.

One by-product of the air base's creation in 1951 was the extension of the existing airport's runways to handle the largest military aircraft. The long runways at North Bay have been maintained as an alternate landing site for Toronto's Pearson International Airport and were used during the September 11 crisis as an emergency landing site for several international aircraft. It was also a designated emergency field for NASA's Space Transportation System, better known as the Space Shuttle.

On March 17, 2007, North Bay was announced as the winner of 2007 Kraft Hockeyville contest. North Bay received $50,000 to upgrade their local arena, Memorial Gardens, and also hosted an NHL pre-season game between the New York Islanders and the Atlanta Thrashers.

Geography

This gives rise to a different and more rugged landscape.

North Bay is geographically unique in that it straddles both the Ottawa River watershed to the east and the Great Lakes Basin to the west. The city's urban core is located between Lake Nipissing and the smaller Trout Lake.

North Bay, critically situated at the junctions of Highway 11 and Highway 17, remains a major transportation centre for Northern Ontario. It is the southern terminus of the Ontario Northland Railway, and is served by the Jack Garland Airport.

The area of North Bay contains a number of ancient volcanic pipes, including the Manitou Islands and Callander Bay and many exposed dykes and five named batholiths (Timber Lake, Mulock, West Arm, Powassan and Bonfield).

Climate 
The climate in North Bay is common to most places in Northern Ontario. North Bay tends to be a less humid climate than that found in Southern Ontario due somewhat to the distance from the Great Lakes and less warm than some other locations in Northern Ontario due to cooling from Lake Nipissing. On May 31, 2002, a tornado caused minor damage near the city. Two more tornadoes touched down on Lake Nipissing on August 20, 2009. This storm was a part of a chain of tornadoes that caused large amounts of damage in other parts of Ontario. The weather box below shows climate normals for the airport, at an elevation of 358 m, but the majority of the city, including the downtown core, sits at an elevation of 201 m.

Economy

North Bay is more economically diverse than many other Northern Ontario communities, although a large percentage of the city's jobs are public sector in nature with health, education and government dominating the list of the city's top employers.

North Bay is the home of Nipissing University, founded in 1992 (previous name North Bay Normal School 1909–1953, North Bay Teachers College 1953–1973, Nipissing University affiliated to Laurentian University 1973–1992, independent public university separated from Laurentian University in 1992), and of Canadore College, founded in 1967. Approximately 10,000 full-time students (and thousands more part-time students) are enrolled at the two post-secondary institutions, which share a campus in the west end of the city.

Between the early 1950s and 1990s 22 Wing/Canadian Forces Base North Bay was the community's leading industry. The cuts to the base by the federal government mentioned above, plus dramatic reductions in the number of its personnel—at one time 2,200 military members and civilian employees; in 2013 about 750—has resulted in a loss of tens of millions of dollars to the community, an impact felt by all North Bay's business sectors.

North Bay is also home to The Algonquin Regiment (Northern Pioneers), A Coy, a Canadian Force Army Reserve unit. B Coy of The Algonquin Regiment (Northern Pioneers) is located in Timmins.

The service industry, tourism, and transportation also play a significant role in the city's economy, as well as primary industry companies. It is estimated that North Bay has more than 65 companies that offer mining supplies and services, employing almost 3,000 residents.

In recent years the city's cultural scene has expanded due to its community of artists, musicians, actors and writers. In 2004, the TVOntario program Studio 2 named North Bay as one of the top three most artistically talented communities in the province.

Film and television
The city has hosted film productions. In 1942 Captains of the Clouds was filmed in North Bay at the height of the Second World War. The film starred James Cagney as a Canadian bush pilot and also featured an appearance of famed fighter pilot Billy Bishop. The city has continued to host film productions, including the 2013 horror film The Colony starring Laurence Fishburne and Bill Paxton, and the drama Still Mine, featuring James Cromwell in an award-winning role. Another film production that occurred in North Bay was the 2014 thriller film Backcountry.

In August 2009, the comedy troupe The Kids in the Hall began filming their mini-series Death Comes to Town on location in North Bay. More recently, the city hosted production of the third season of Hard Rock Medical.

The city is fictionalised as "Algonquin Bay" in the mystery novels of North Bay native Giles Blunt, beginning with Forty Words for Sorrow. The television series adaptation Cardinal was filmed in both North Bay and Sudbury in 2016.

In 2017, the crime drama series Carter was filmed in the city.

In 2021, the reality series Call Me Mother was filmed in North Bay.

In 2022, North Star Studios announced the acquisition of a building in the West Ferris Industrial Park, which will provide 68,000 square feet of film and television studio space.

Education
North Bay has educational programs ranging from pre-school to university.

Post-secondary schools
Nipissing University
Canadore College
Modern College
Canadian Career College

School boards
Near North District School Board
Nipissing-Parry Sound Catholic District School Board
Conseil scolaire de district catholique Franco-Nord
Conseil scolaire de district du Nord-Est de l'Ontario

Neighbourhoods

The city includes the neighbourhoods of Birchaven, Camp Champlain, Champlain Park, Cooks Mills, Eastview, Feronia, Gateway, Graniteville, Hornell Heights, La Fuente (Lobby Bar), Lounsbury, Kenwood Hills, Marshall Park, P.J. Clowe Rotary Park, Nipissing Junction, Pinewood, Sage, Ski Club, St. John's Village, Sunset Park, Thibeault Terrace, Thorncliff, Trout Mills, Tweedsmuir, Wallace Heights, West Ferris and Widdifield.

Waterfront development

The city has big plans for the waterfront. In the 1980s a mile-long waterfront park/promenade was developed along the Lake Nipissing shoreline adjacent to the downtown core. Eventually, such attractions as a mini-train ride and two antique carousels (largely crafted by local artisans) were installed and quickly became very popular with tourists and locals alike. Now, work is beginning on a large new multi-faceted community park that will be developed on the former Canadian Pacific Railway yards that separated the downtown core from the existing waterfront park. In August 2009, a new pedestrian underpass opened connecting the downtown core to the waterfront for the first time since the CPR laid down tracks. In 2019 the city constructed a multi-phase community space centering on a Splash Pad behind the CPR museum.

Media

Online media
BayToday.ca is an online local news source in North Bay, offering the latest breaking news, weather updates, entertainment, sports and business features, obituaries and more.

Print media
The local newspaper is the North Bay Nugget, which is published in print form from Tuesday through Saturday.

Television
The city's sole local television station is CKNY-DT, an owned-and-operated station of CTV. Part of the CTV Northern Ontario subsystem, CKNY functions largely as a rebroadcaster of CICI-TV in Greater Sudbury, although news reporters in North Bay provide content to CTV Northern Ontario's newscasts. In 2020, the staff was reduced to two reporters and a cameraman/editor, all of whom will work from home. The city also receives Global and CHCH through rebroadcast transmitters of stations in the Toronto market.

Radio
In radio, North Bay effectively acts as a single market with the nearby town of Sturgeon Falls, with virtually all stations in both communities serving the whole region.

Sports

Local teams
 Canadore College Panthers (Men's & Women's Volleyball/OCAA)
 Canadore College Panthers (Men's Basketball/OCAA)
 Nipissing University Lakers (Ringette/CUR)
 Nipissing University Lakers (Men's & Woman's Hockey/OUA)
 Nipissing University Lakers (Men's & Women's Volleyball/OUA)
 Nipissing University Lakers (Men's & Women's Crosscountry Running/OUA)
 Nipissing University Lakers (Men's Lacrosse/CUFLA)
 Nipissing University Lakers (Men's & Women's Basketball/OUA
 Nipissing University Lakers (Dance team) 
Nipissing University Lakers (cheerleading team)
 North Bay Bulldogs (Football/Northern Football Conference)
 North Bay Trappers Junior "A" (Hockey/Northern Ontario Junior Hockey League)
 North Bay Trappers Midget "AAA" (Hockey/Great North Midget AAA League)
 North Bay United (U-17 Men's Soccer)
 North Bay Stingers Midget Baseball (3 time provincial champions)
 Warriors of Hope Competitive Dragon Boat Team
 Nipissing Wild (Ontario Football Conference Varsity League)
 North Bay Battalion (OHL)
 North Bay Junior Varsity Bulldogs (Ontario Varsity Football league)

Kraft Hockeyville 2007
North Bay was crowned the winner of the Kraft Hockeyville competition in 2007. The New York Islanders and Atlanta Thrashers played an exhibition game at Memorial Gardens to a near-capacity crowd.

North Bay Battalion
The North Bay Battalion is a major junior ice hockey team in the Ontario Hockey League based in North Bay, Ontario, Canada. The franchise was founded as the Brampton Battalion on December 3, 1996, and began play in 1998. Due to consistently poor attendance, the team relocated to North Bay before the 2013–14 OHL season.

Nipissing Lakers Hockey
The Nipissing Lakers are North Bay's newest hockey team. The Lakers are the 19th member of the Ontario University Athletics' Men's Hockey League (founded in 2009 in a partnership with Nipissing University and private investors). The Lakers play in historic Memorial Gardens (circa 1955) and share the building with the North Bay Trappers. Like their Northern Ontario counterparts in Thunder Bay (the Lakehead Thunderwolves), the Lakers attract an impressive number of local hockey supporters for their games in the OUA.

North Bay Trappers Junior "A"
The North Bay Trappers (formerly the North Bay Skyhawks) were relocated from Sturgeon Falls in 2002 (following the departure of the OHL's North Bay Centennials to Saginaw, Michigan). The Trappers are members of the 8 team NOJHL Junior "A" circuit (Northern Ontario Junior Hockey League). The Skyhawks/Trappers franchise has won 3 NOJHL championship titles (2002–03, 2003–04 & 2004–05). In April 2014 the Trappers were sold to become the Mattawa Blackhawks

North Bay Bulldogs
The North Bay Bulldogs compete in the nine-team, Ontario-based NFC (Northern Football Conference). The Bulldogs were relocated from Brampton in 1991 to the Gateway City.
The North Bay Bulldogs were welcomed into the Ontario Varsity Football League while losing all eight games (0–8) in their 2013 inaugural season.

Recreation

North Bay has many areas available for recreation and leisure, including over 72 sports fields and parks, a marina on Lake Nipissing that holds 270 boats, a plethora of trails and 42 beach access points on both Lake Nipissing and Trout Lake.

Recreation and leisure services
Kate Pace Way
Kinsmen Trail
Nordic Ski Club
Laurentian Ski Hill
North Bay Memorial Gardens Sports Arena
Pete Palangio Arena
West Ferris Community Centre

Transportation

North Bay is located at the easternmost junction of Highway 11 and Highway 17, which are both segments of the Trans-Canada Highway. The two highways share a single route through the city core, between Algonquin Avenue and an interchange at Twin Lakes, along an urban limited-access road with reduced but not fully controlled access. Major arterial streets intersect directly with the highway, while minor streets end at a network of service roads connecting them to the arterials. At Algonquin Avenue, Highway 17 continues westward to Sturgeon Falls and Sudbury, while Highway 11 heads north toward Temiskaming Shores. At the eastern interchange, Highway 17 heads eastward toward Mattawa, Pembroke and Ottawa, while Highway 11 widens into a freeway and heads southerly toward Barrie and Toronto.

Highway 11 and Highway 17 both formerly had business spur routes through downtown North Bay, Highway 11B and Highway 17B, although both have been decommissioned by the province and are now designated only as city streets. North Bay is also served by Highway 63, a route which extends northeasterly from the city toward Thorne, where it crosses the Ottawa River and becomes Quebec Route 101.

Due to the steep incline of Algonquin Avenue/Highway 11 as it enters North Bay from the north on Thibeault Hill, the southbound lanes are equipped with the only runaway truck ramp on Ontario's provincial highway system.

North Bay is served by the North Bay/Jack Garland Airport, which also receives and services military flights on behalf of the adjacent CFB North Bay, is home to Canadore College Aviation Campus, and site of numerous aviation companies, including Voyageur Airways and the Bombardier Aerospace CL-415 water bomber final assembly and flight testing facility.

Intercity bus service in the city operates from the North Bay railway station on Station Road.

The city operates a public transit system, North Bay Transit.

Police Service

The North Bay Police Service was founded in 1882, and is overseen by the North Bay City Council's Police Services Board. In 2018, it had a budget of C$18.6 Million.

Demographics

In 2021 11.7% of the population was Indigenous, compared to 5.0% nationally. 4.4% of residents were visible minorities compared to 26.5% nationally. The remaining 83.9% of the population was white/European. The largest visible minority groups in North Bay were South Asian (1.4%), Black (1.1%), and Chinese (0.5%). 

81.1% of the population spoke English as their mother tongue. French was the first language of 11.3% of residents, compared to 3.3% in all of Ontario. In terms of non-official languages, the most common were Italian (0.6%), Chinese languages (0.3%), German (0.3%), and Spanish (0.3%). 2.2% of residents listed both English and French as mother tongues, while 0.7% listed both English and a non-official language.

56.3% of residents were Christian, down from 73.2% in 2011. 35.2% were Catholic, 13.2% were Protestant, 4.1% were Christian n.o.s and 3.8% belonged to other Christian denominations and Christian-related traditions. 41.6% of the population were non-religious or secular, up from 25.4% in 2011. All other religions made up 2.0% of the population. The largest non-Christian religion was Hinduism (0.5%).

North Bay census agglomeration population was 70,378 as of 2016.

Notable people

 Sam Jacks, inventor of Ringette and Floor hockey
 Giles Blunt, author
Mike Bolan, former Liberal MP, Superior Court judge
 Kirsten Bos, researcher of ancient DNA
 Gerald Bull, aerospace engineer, expert in ballistics, assassinated
 Amanda Burk, artist 
 Chuck Cadman, politician and member of Parliament
 Jessica Cameron, actress
 Harvey Charters, silver medalist at 1936 Olympics in canoeing
 Mike Conroy, WHA hockey player
 Billy Coutu, NHL hockey player
 Ab DeMarco Sr, former NHL hockey player
 Nick Denis, former mixed martial arts fighter and biochemist
 Kevin Frankish, Toronto-area media personality. He co-hosts Breakfast Television on City.
 Bobby Gimby, orchestra leader, singer/songwriter who wrote the Canadian Centennial song
 Mike Harris, former Premier of Ontario
 Alison Herst, Olympian (Kayak: 1992 Barcelona; 1996 Atlanta)
 High Holy Days, rock music group
 Bill Houlder, former NHL player
 Troy Hurtubise, inventor
 Byron M. Jones, Christian movie producer and managing partner of Pure Flix Entertainment
 Gordon Kannegiesser, former NHL player
 Sheldon Kannegiesser, former NHL player
 Larry Keenan, former NHL player
 Sean Kelly, glam-rock guitarist and vocalist
 Pierre LeBrun, hockey journalist
 Cory Marks, country rock singer
 Steve McLaren, former NHL/AHL player
 Lise Meloche, Olympian (Biathlon: 1992 Albertville; 1994 Lillehammer)
 Gerry Mendicino, actor
 Keke Mortson, WHA hockey player, North Bay Sports Hall of Fame inductee
 Claude Noël, former NHL head coach for the Winnipeg Jets
 Bryan Lee O'Malley, cartoonist, creator and author of the Scott Pilgrim series of graphic novels
 Mike O'Shea, CFL head coach for the Winnipeg Blue Bombers, and former CFL linebacker
 Barbara Olmsted, Olympian (Canoeing: 1984 Los Angeles (Bronze); 1988 Seoul)
 Nancy Olmsted, Olympian (Canoeing: 1984 Los Angeles; 1988 Seoul)
 Steve Omischl, world champion, freestyle skiing aerials
 Kate Pace, world downhill alpine ski champion
 Pete Palangio, former NHL player
 Tony Poeta, former NHL player
 Denis Rancourt, scientist, educational reform activist, former physics professor at the University of Ottawa
 Julia Rivard, Olympic athlete (canoe/kayak), business leader
 Craig Rivet, former NHL player
 Anthony Rota, MP and Speaker of the House of Commons
 Steve Shields, former NHL goalie
 Colin Simpson, author
Katherine E. Stange, mathematician
 Lance Storm, professional wrestler
 Scott Thompson, comedic actor
 Kenneth Thomson, 2nd Baron Thomson of Fleet
 Darren Turcotte, former NHL player
 Jim Watson, actor
 Mike Yeo, former St. Louis Blues Head Coach

Sister cities
 Moncton, New Brunswick

See also

List of francophone communities in Ontario

Notes

References

External links

 

 
Cities in Ontario
Single-tier municipalities in Ontario
Lake Nipissing